Maria Sastre is an American businesswoman. She was the President (2013) and COO (2010) of Signature Flight Support until May 2018. On May 9, 2018, it was announced that Sastre had been elected to the General Mills board of directors, effective June 1, 2018.

Sastre has a degree in accounting from Miami Dade College as well as a Bachelor of Arts in finance and a Master of Business Administration from the New York Institute of Technology.

References

Living people
American chief operating officers
American women business executives
American business executives
Women corporate executives
American aviation businesspeople
British businesspeople
Year of birth missing (living people)
21st-century American women